Nonthaburi is a city in Thailand.

Nonthaburi may also refer to:
Nonthaburi Province, a province of Thailand
Mueang Nonthaburi District, the capital district of Nonthaburi Province, Thailand